Super Bowl X was an American football game between the National Football Conference (NFC) champion Dallas Cowboys and the American Football Conference (AFC) champion Pittsburgh Steelers to decide the National Football League (NFL) champion for the 1975 season. The Steelers defeated the Cowboys by the score of 21–17 to win their second consecutive Super Bowl. They were the third team to win back-to-back Super Bowls. (The Miami Dolphins won Super Bowls VII and VIII, and the Green Bay Packers won Super Bowls I and II.) It was also the first Super Bowl in which both participating teams had previously won a Super Bowl, as the Steelers were the defending champions and the Cowboys had won Super Bowl VI.

The game was played at the Miami Orange Bowl in Miami, Florida, on January 18, 1976, one of the first major national events of the United States Bicentennial year. Both the pre-game and halftime show celebrated the Bicentennial, while players on both teams wore special patches on their jerseys with the Bicentennial logo.

Super Bowl X featured a contrast of playing styles between the Steelers and the Cowboys, which were the two most popular teams in the league. The Steelers, dominating teams with their "Steel Curtain" defense and running game, finished the regular season with a league best 12–2 record and defeated the Baltimore Colts and the Oakland Raiders in the playoffs. The Cowboys, with their offense and "flex" defense, became the first NFC wild-card team to advance to the Super Bowl after posting a 10–4 regular season record and postseason victories over the Minnesota Vikings and the Los Angeles Rams.

Trailing 10–7 in the fourth quarter of Super Bowl X, the Steelers rallied to score 14 unanswered points, including a 64-yard touchdown reception by Pittsburgh wide receiver Lynn Swann. The Cowboys cut the score, 21–17, late in the game with wide receiver Percy Howard's 34-yard touchdown reception, but Pittsburgh safety Glen Edwards halted Dallas' rally with an end zone interception as time expired. Swann, who caught four passes for a Super Bowl record 161 yards and one touchdown, became the first wide receiver to be named Super Bowl MVP.

Background
The NFL awarded Super Bowl X to Miami on April 3, 1973, at the owners' meetings held in Scottsdale, Arizona. This was the fourth time that the Super Bowl was to be played at the Miami Orange Bowl. For the second time, the owners selected two consecutive Super Bowl host cities at the same meeting. Only three cities submitted bids for the two games. Representatives from New Orleans, Miami, and Los Angeles each made presentations; all three cities had already hosted the Super Bowl. New Orleans was awarded Super Bowl IX, while Miami was given X.

As part of their pitch, the representatives from Miami specifically requested the 1976 game over the 1975 game. Miami had initially been selected as one of the United States Bicentennial celebration cities, so Joe Robbie and Don Shula lobbied in favor of tying the game to the Bicentennial.

Dallas Cowboys

The Cowboys, considered a Cinderella team entering the Super Bowl, advanced to their third Super Bowl in team history with their rather high-tech offense and "flex" defense. Quarterback Roger Staubach had a solid season, passing for 2,666 yards and 17 touchdowns (but he also threw 16 interceptions), while also rushing for 310 yards. Staubach's favorite target was wide receiver Drew Pearson who led the team with 46 receptions for 822 yards and 8 touchdowns. Wide receiver Golden Richards and tight end Jean Fugett were also reliable targets in the Cowboys' passing game, combining for 59 receptions and 939 receiving yards.

But despite their solid passing game, Dallas was a run-based team. Fullback Robert Newhouse was their leading rusher with
930 yards, and also caught 34 passes for 274 yards. Halfback Doug Dennison contributed 388 yards. Perhaps the most talented player in the backfield was halfback Preston Pearson (no relation to receiver Drew Pearson), who signed on the team as a free agent after being cut by the Steelers in the preseason.  Preston rushed for 509 yards, caught 27 passes for 351 yards, and added another 391 yards returning kickoffs.  Preston had been especially effective in the playoffs, where he caught 12 passes for 200 yards and three touchdowns, and was extremely eager to increase his numbers in the Super Bowl against the team that let him go.  Up front, the offensive line was led by All-Pro right tackle Rayfield Wright.

The Cowboys' "Flex" defense was anchored by linemen Harvey Martin and Ed "Too Tall" Jones. Linebacker Lee Roy Jordan led the team with six interceptions, while linebacker D.D. Lewis was an effective weapon pass rushing. The starting players in Dallas' defensive secondary, future Hall of Fame cornerback Mel Renfro, cornerback Mark Washington, and safeties Charlie Waters and future Hall of Famer Cliff Harris, combined for 12 interceptions.

Even though the Cowboys finished in second place in the NFC East with a 10–4 record, they qualified for the playoffs as the NFC's wild-card team (during that time, only one wild card team from each conference entered the playoffs).  The Dallas Cowboys became the first NFC wild card team to reach the Super Bowl.

Pittsburgh Steelers

The Steelers became the first official #1 seed to reach the Super Bowl. Playoff seeds were instituted in 1975. The Steelers finished the regular season with a league-best 12–2 record, dominating opponents with their "Steel Curtain" defense and powerful running game.  The team finished the season ranked 5th in most points scored (373) and 2nd in fewest points allowed (162). Fullback Franco Harris ranked second in the league with 1,246 rushing yards and 10 touchdowns, while also catching 28 passes for 214 yards and another touchdown. Halfback Rocky Bleier had 528 rushing yards, and fullback John "Frenchy" Fuqua added 285 yards and 18 receptions. Still, the Steelers had a fine passing attack led by quarterback Terry Bradshaw. Bradshaw threw for 2,055 yards, 18 touchdowns, and nine interceptions while rushing for 210 yards and three touchdowns. One reason why Bradshaw's numbers were much improved from the previous season was the emergence of wide receivers Lynn Swann and John Stallworth. Both saw limited playing time in the previous season, but became significant contributors in 1975. Swann caught a team-leading 49 passes for 781 yards and 11 touchdowns. Stallworth only had 20 receptions, but he had an average of 21.2 yards per catch, recording a total of 423 reception yards.

The Steelers' "Steel Curtain" defense dominated the league, ranking third in fewest yards allowed (4,019) and sending 8 of their 11 starters to the Pro Bowl: defensive linemen Joe Greene (future Pro Football Hall of Fame player) and L. C. Greenwood; future Hall of Fame linebackers Jack Ham and Jack Lambert; Andy Russell, the team's third starting linebacker; future Hall of Fame defensive back Mel Blount; and safeties Glen Edwards and Mike Wagner.

Greene made the Pro Bowl despite missing six games with injuries. Ham and Lambert had the best seasons of their careers, while Blount led the league with 11 interceptions and was named the NFL's Defensive Player of the Year.  Wagner had 4 interceptions and 3 fumble recoveries, while Edwards had 3 interceptions, while also returning 25 punts for 267 yards.

Playoffs

Dallas went on to defeat the Minnesota Vikings, 17–14, with a 50-yard touchdown pass from Staubach to Drew Pearson with less than a minute to play in what was called the "Hail Mary pass". They went on to crush the Los Angeles Rams, 37–7, in the NFC Championship Game. As a result, the Cowboys became the first wild card team to advance to the Super Bowl.

Meanwhile, even though Pittsburgh's offense lost a total of 12 turnovers in their two playoff games, the Steelers only gave up a combined total of 20 points in their victories over the Baltimore Colts in the AFC Divisional playoff game 28–10, and the Oakland Raiders in the AFC Championship Game 16–10.

Super Bowl pregame news and notes
Coming into Super Bowl X, most sports writers and fans expected that Swann would not play. He had suffered a severe concussion in the AFC Championship Game against the Raiders that forced him to spend two days in a hospital. If he did play, many assumed he would just be used as a decoy to draw coverage away from the other receivers.

Throughout the week leading up to the Super Bowl, Swann was unable to participate in several team practices or was limited to only a minor workout in them. However, a few days before the game, he received a verbal challenge from Dallas safety Cliff Harris, who stated, "I'm not going to hurt anyone intentionally. But getting hit again while he's running a pass route must be in the back of Swann's mind. I know it would be in the back of my mind."

Swann responded "I'm still not 100 percent. I value my health, but I've had no dizzy spells. I read what Harris said. He was trying to intimidate me. He said I'd be afraid out there. He needn't worry. He doesn't know Lynn Swann. He can't scare me or the team. I said to myself, 'The hell with it, I'm gonna play.'  Sure, I thought about the possibility of being reinjured. But it's like being thrown by a horse. You have to get up and ride again immediately or you may be scared the rest of your life."

Super Bowl X was the final NFL officiating assignment for veteran referee Norm Schachter, who also served as the referee for Super Bowl I and Super Bowl V. Schachter, one of six men to serve as referee for at least three Super Bowls, worked as an officiating supervisor and instant replay official following his on-field retirement. This was the first Super Bowl where penalties and other information were announced by the referee over a wireless microphone, an innovation of Cowboys general manager Tex Schramm which went into effect at the start of the 1975 season.

Super Bowl X was also the first Super Bowl where the starting placekickers were both soccer-style kickers: Roy Gerela for Pittsburgh and Toni Fritsch for Dallas.

This was the first Super Bowl to have the game's respective edition denoted on the field. It was located at the 35-yard line but only the roman numeral. Beginning the next year, the entire name of that years Super Bowl would be on the 35 yard line. The NFL would do this up until Super Bowl XXXI where they placed the team's helmets at the 30-yard line and the Super Bowl logo at the 50 yard line, this practice would continue until Super Bowl XXXVII where it was retired immediately following that game. The NFL shield would return to the 50 yard line (in addition to placing that games logo at the 25 yard line) the next year where it has remained ever since.

Broadcasting
CBS televised the game in the United States with play-by-play announcer Pat Summerall (calling his first Super Bowl in that role) and color commentator Tom Brookshier. Toward the end of the game, Hank Stram took over for Brookshier, who had left the booth to head down to the locker room area to conduct the postgame interviews with the winning team. Two days after the Super Bowl, Stram was hired as coach of the New Orleans Saints, interrupting his broadcasting career for two seasons.

On radio, Verne Lundquist and Al Wisk announced the game for the Dallas Cowboys Radio Network, and Jack Fleming and Myron Cope called the game for the Pittsburgh Steelers Radio Network. Ed Ingles and Jim Kelly called the game nationally for CBS Radio. Hosting television coverage was The NFL Today crew of Brent Musburger, Irv Cross and Phyllis George. During this game, CBS began using Jack Trombey's "Horizontal Hold" as the theme music. That would be used the following season for the NFL Today pregame show between 1976 and 1980 in its original form, with a remake for 1981 followed by updates for 1984 and 1989 (which would also be used from 1998 to 2002) before its retirement.

CBS followed the game with coverage of the final round of the Phoenix Open joined in progress.

Entertainment

The overall theme of the Super Bowl entertainment was to celebrate the United States Bicentennial. Each Cowboys and Steelers player wore a special patch with the Bicentennial logo on their jerseys.

This was the first Super Bowl where somebody other than the game's referee tossed the coin, in this case, John Warner who was the United States Secretary of the Navy from 1972 to 1974. Prior to 1976, the coin toss was held a half-hour before kick-off.

The performance event group Up with People performed during both the pregame festivities and the halftime show titled "200 Years and Just a Baby: A Tribute to America's Bicentennial". Up with People dancers portrayed various American historical figures along with a rendition of Steve Goodman's "City of New Orleans".  Singer Tom Sullivan sang the national anthem.

Scenes for the 1977 suspense film Black Sunday, about a fictional terrorist attack on the Super Bowl via the Goodyear Blimp, were filmed during the game.

This was the last Super Bowl to kick off as early as 2:00 p.m. (EST), thereby allowing a finish time before the commencement of many of the nation's evening church services.

This was the first Super Bowl where the play clock was visible to teams and spectators. Visible play clocks were mandated by NFL rules beginning with the 1976 season.

This was the last Super Bowl where the coin toss was conducted 30 minutes prior to kickoff. Beginning with the next season, the official coin toss was moved to three minutes before kickoff in the center of the field, leaving coaches to scramble to put the proper specialty unit on the field. From 1947 to 1975, a "mock toss" was held three minutes prior to kickoff at midfield to inform fans and media of the result.

Game summary
The Steelers won their second straight Super Bowl, largely through the plays by Swann and by stopping a rally by the Cowboys late in the fourth quarter.  Officials did not call a single penalty on the Steelers during the game, while the Cowboys were called for only 2 penalties for 20 yards.

First quarter
On the opening kickoff, the Cowboys ran a reverse where rookie linebacker Thomas "Hollywood" Henderson took a handoff from Preston Pearson and returned the ball a Super Bowl-record 48 yards before kicker Roy Gerela forced him out of bounds at the Steelers' 44-yard line. Gerela suffered badly bruised ribs that appeared to affect his kicking performance all afternoon. On the first play of the game, Steelers defensive lineman L. C. Greenwood sacked Cowboys quarterback Roger Staubach, forcing him to fumble. Although Dallas center John Fitzgerald recovered the fumble, they eventually were forced to punt. The sack was a foreshadow of things to come for Staubach, who was sacked seven times on the day. The Steelers managed to get one first down and advanced to their own 40-yard line, but then they too were forced to punt. Steelers punter Bobby Walden fumbled the snap. Walden managed to recover his own fumble, but Dallas took over on the Steelers' 29-yard line.  On the very next play, Staubach threw a 29-yard touchdown pass to wide receiver Drew Pearson, taking a 7–0 lead. The score was the first touchdown permitted in the first quarter by the Steelers' defense in 1975.

Instead of trying to immediately tie the game on a long passing play, the Steelers ran the ball on the first four plays of their ensuing possession, and then quarterback Terry Bradshaw completed a 32-yard pass to wide receiver Lynn Swann to reach the Cowboys' 16-yard line. Swann soared over the outstretched reach of defensive back Mark Washington before tight-roping the sideline to make the reception. Two running plays further advanced the ball to the 7-yard line. Then on third down and one, the Steelers managed to fool the Cowboys.  Pittsburgh brought in three tight ends, which usually signals a running play (Steelers guard Gerry Mullins was also an eligible receiver on the play as he moved to the tight end position).  After the snap, tight end Randy Grossman faked a block to the inside as if it were a running play, but then ran a pass route into the end zone, and Bradshaw threw the ball to him for a touchdown, tying the game, 7–7. This marked the first Super Bowl that both teams scored in the first quarter.

Second quarter
Dallas responded on their next drive, advancing the ball 51 yards, all rushing, (30 of them on five carries from fullback Robert Newhouse) before incurring a third down false start penalty, and scoring on kicker Toni Fritsch's 36-yard field goal to take a 10–7 lead early in the second quarter. The 51 rushing yards the Cowboys amassed on the drive tripled what the Minnesota Vikings gained against Pittsburgh for all of Super Bowl IX. The Steelers subsequently advanced to the Cowboys' 36-yard line on their next possession, but on fourth down and two, Bradshaw's pass was broken up by Dallas safety Cliff Harris.

Later in the period, Dallas drove to the Steelers' 20-yard line. But in three plays, the Cowboys lost 25 yards. On first down, Newhouse was tackled for a 3-yard loss by linebacker Andy Russell. Then Greenwood sacked Staubach for a 12-yard loss.  And on third down, Staubach was sacked again, this time for a 10-yard loss, by defensive end Dwight White. The sacks pushed Dallas out of field goal range and they were forced to punt.  The Steelers' offense got the ball back their own 6-yard line with 3:47 left in the half. On the drive, Bradshaw completed a 53-yard pass to Swann to advance the ball to the Cowboys' 37-yard line; Swann's catch has become one of the most memorable acrobatic catches in Super Bowl history.  On the very next play, Bradshaw just missed connections with Swann at the Dallas 6 (although CBS's Pat Summerall thought the incomplete pass was intended for John Stallworth) . Pittsburgh drove to the 19-yard line after the two-minute warning, but the drive stalled there and ended with no points after Gerela missed a 36-yard field goal attempt with 22 seconds remaining in the period.

Third quarter
Early in the third quarter, Pittsburgh got a great scoring opportunity when defensive back J. T. Thomas intercepted a pass from Staubach and returned it 35 yards to the Cowboys' 25-yard line. However, once again the Steelers failed to score as the Dallas defense kept Pittsburgh out of the end zone and Gerela missed his second field goal, a 33-yard attempt.  After the miss, Harris mockingly patted Gerela on his helmet and thanked him for "helping Dallas out".  Gerela grabbed Harris and began engaging him verbally, but Steeler linebacker Jack Lambert, who was standing nearby, grabbed Harris and threw him to the ground in defense of Gerela. Lambert could have been ejected from the game for defending his teammate, but the officials decided to allow him to remain. The third quarter was completely scoreless and the Cowboys maintained their 10–7 lead going into the final period.

Fourth quarter
Early in the fourth quarter, Dallas punter Mitch Hoopes was forced to punt from inside his own goal line.  As Hoopes stepped up to make the kick, Steelers running back Reggie Harrison broke through the line and blocked the punt.  The ball went through the end zone for a safety, cutting the Dallas lead to 10–9. It was the second safety recorded in Super Bowl history, the first occurring a year earlier when White downed Minnesota's Fran Tarkenton on a fumble recovery in the end zone. Then Steelers running back Mike Collier returned the free kick 25 yards to the Cowboys' 45-yard line.  Dallas halted the ensuing drive at the 20-yard line, but this time Gerela successfully kicked a 36-yard field goal to give Pittsburgh their first lead of the game, 12–10. Then on the first play of the Cowboys' next drive, Steelers defensive back Mike Wagner intercepted a pass from Staubach and returned it 19 yards to the Dallas 7-yard line. Wagner's interception came off the same play Dallas used to score their opening touchdown. Instead of surveying the middle of the field, Wagner watched Pearson and recognized the pattern. Staubach later said: "It was our bread and butter play all season long. It was the first time it didn't work."  The Cowboys defense again managed to prevent a touchdown, but Gerela kicked an 18-yard field goal to increase the Steelers lead to 15–10.

The Steelers forced a punt and regained possession of the ball on their own 30-yard line with 4:25 left in the final period, giving them a chance to either increase their lead or run out the clock to win the game. But after two plays, the Steelers found themselves facing 3rd-and-4 on their own 36-yard line. Assuming that the Cowboys would be expecting a short pass or a run, Bradshaw decided to try a long pass and told Swann in the huddle to run a deep post pattern. As Bradshaw dropped back to pass, Harris and linebacker D.D. Lewis both blitzed in an attempt to sack him. But Bradshaw managed to dodge Lewis and throw the ball just before being leveled by Harris and lineman Larry Cole, who landed a helmet-to-helmet hit on Bradshaw. Swann then caught the ball at the 5-yard line and ran into the end zone for a 64-yard touchdown completion. Bradshaw never did see Swann's catch or the touchdown since Cole's hit to Bradshaw's helmet knocked him out of the game with a head injury. It was only after he was assisted to the locker room that he was told what happened.

After play resumed, Gerela missed the extra point attempt, but the Steelers now had a 21–10 lead with 3:02 left in the game, and the Cowboys needed two touchdowns to come back.

Staubach then led his team 80 yards in 5 plays on the ensuing drive, scoring on a 34-yard touchdown pass to wide receiver Percy Howard and cutting their deficit to 21–17 (Howard's touchdown reception was the only catch of his NFL career; he was not mentioned by name by John Facenda in the highlight package produced by NFL Films). After Gerry Mullins recovered Dallas' onside kick attempt, the Steelers, now quarterbacked by backup Terry Hanratty, then tried to run out the clock on the next drive with four straight running plays, but the Cowboys defense stopped them on fourth down at their 39-yard line, giving Dallas one more chance to win. Some questioned why Noll would elect to go for it on fourth down but, as later explained by NFL Films, his entire kicking game had been suspect all game long with Gerela missing an extra point and two field goals while Walden fumbled a snap on a punt, and nearly had two punts blocked. (Gerela's problems may have begun on the opening kickoff when he was forced to make a touchdown saving tackle on Hollywood Henderson.)

With 1:22 left in the game, Staubach started out the drive with an 11-yard scramble to midfield, and then followed it up with a 12-yard completion to Preston Pearson at the Steelers' 38-yard line. Pearson inexplicably ran towards the middle rather than running out of bounds to stop the clock.  On the next play, Staubach couldn't handle a low snap but managed to recover the ball and throw it downfield for an incompletion. On second down with 12 seconds left, he threw a pass intended for Howard in the end zone, but the ball bounced off Howard's helmet and a Hail Mary replay was not to be. Had Howard positioned himself inches back from his position in the end zone as the ball came down he would have had a better opportunity to catch the ball and write himself into Cowboy folklore. Then on third down, Staubach once again tried to complete a pass to Howard in the end zone, but the ball was tipped by Wagner into the arms of safety Glen Edwards for an interception as time expired, sealing Pittsburgh's victory.

Bradshaw finished the game with 9 out of 19 pass completions for 209 yards and two touchdowns, with no interceptions. He also added another 16 yards rushing the ball.  Staubach completed 15 out of 24 passes for 204 yards and two touchdowns with three interceptions. He also rushed for 22 yards on five carries, but was sacked seven times. It was the first Super Bowl where every touchdown was scored on a pass play. Steelers running back Franco Harris was the leading rusher of the game with 82 rushing yards, and also caught a pass for 26 yards.  Newhouse was the Cowboys top rusher with 56 yards, and caught two passes for 12 yards.  Greenwood recorded a Super Bowl record four sacks but it has gone unrecognized since the NFL didn't officially record sacks until 1982.

Aftermath
The game was remembered for being the most exciting of the first 10 Super Bowl games. Swann's heroics and Lambert's 14 tackles and throw-down of Cliff Harris are the indelible images from the game. After being benched to start the 1974 campaign and being booed for most of his first four seasons in Pittsburgh, Bradshaw became the first quarterback to throw two game-winning touchdown passes in Super Bowl competition. The Steelers' bid for three-consecutive championships ended in a 24–7 loss to the Oakland Raiders in the 1976 AFC Championship game after a season that saw Pittsburgh's defense shut out five opponents and allow only 28 points in a 9-game span. The loss to Pittsburgh coupled with an early playoff exit in 1976 largely influenced the Cowboys to draft Tony Dorsett in the 1977 Draft to help infuse life into Dallas' offense. Dorsett helped lead Dallas to a Super Bowl XII victory over the Denver Broncos, who defeated the Steelers in the first round of the playoffs that year.

Pittsburgh and Dallas would battle in another thriller in Super Bowl XIII (also played in Miami). The result was the same, as the Steelers prevailed 35–31. But Super Bowl X was the game that began the rivalry between the two storied franchises. The Cowboys gained a measure of revenge by defeating the Steelers 27–17 in Super Bowl XXX following the 1995 season.

This was the final football game to be played on artificial turf (specifically, Poly-Turf) at the Orange Bowl. The surface in 1976 reverted to natural grass, and remained so until the stadium's closure in 2007. Poly-Turf was first installed at the Orange Bowl in 1970 and replaced in 1972, but players complained often of the slickness of the surfaces, and fields became discolored due to the intense sunshine common to south Florida. This would also be the last Super Bowl played outdoors on artificial turf until Super Bowl XLVIII (2014, some 39 years later) at MetLife Stadium which would be played on FieldTurf.

Box score

Final statistics
Sources:  NFL.com Super Bowl X, Super Bowl X Play Finder Pit, Super Bowl X Play Finder Dal

Statistical comparison

Individual statistics

1Completions/attempts
2Carries
3Long gain
4Receptions
5Times targeted

Records set
The following records were set in Super Bowl X, according to the official NFL.com boxscore, the 2016 NFL Record & Fact Book and the ProFootball reference.com game summary. Some records have to meet NFL minimum number of attempts to be recognized. The minimums are shown (in parenthesis).

 † This category includes rushing, receiving, interception returns, punt returns, kickoff returns, and fumble returns.
 ‡ Sacks an official statistic since Super Bowl XVII by the NFL. Sacks are listed as "Tackled Attempting to Pass" in the official NFL box score for Super Bowl X.

Turnovers are defined as the number of times losing the ball on interceptions and fumbles.

Starting lineups
 Source:

Officials
 Referee: Norm Schachter #56 third Super Bowl (I, V)
 Umpire: Joe Connell #57 second Super Bowl (VI)
 Head Linesman: Leo Miles #35 second Super Bowl (VIII)
 Line Judge: Jack Fette #39 third Super Bowl (V, VIII)
 Back Judge: Stan Javie #29 third Super Bowl (II, VIII)
 Field Judge: Bill O'Brien #83 first Super Bowl
 Alternates Bob Frederic #71 and Gordon McCarter #48 (neither officiated a Super Bowl on the field)

This was the first Super Bowl in which the referee wore a wireless microphone to announce penalties and other rulings to the audience in the stadium, those listening on radio and those watching on television. The idea was pioneered by Cowboys GM Tex Schramm.

Norm Schachter retired following this game and became an officiating supervisor. He became the first official to serve as referee for three Super Bowls, a mark later equaled by Jim Tunney, Pat Haggerty, Bob McElwee and Terry McAulay, and surpassed by Jerry Markbreit with four.

Note: A seven-official system was not used until 1978

Notes

References

 
 
 
 
 https://www.pro-football-reference.com – Large online database of NFL data and statistics
 Super Bowl play-by-plays from USA Today (Last accessed September 28, 2005)
 All-Time Super Bowl Odds from The Sports Network (Last accessed October 16, 2005)
 Gil Brandt's reflections on the game

Super Bowl
Pittsburgh Steelers postseason
Dallas Cowboys postseason
1975 National Football League season
American football in Miami
Sports competitions in Miami
January 1976 sports events in the United States
1970s in Miami
1976 in sports in Florida